David Allison Dodge  (born June 8, 1943) is a Canadian economist. He served as Governor of the Bank of Canada from 2001 to 2008.

Early life

Dodge was born in Toronto, Ontario, Canada in 1943. He attended Ridley College, a private boarding school in St. Catharines (and second alumnus to become Bank Governor), and graduated from Queen's University with an honours degree in economics. He received his Ph.D in economics from Princeton University in 1972 after completing a doctoral dissertation titled "The structure of earnings of Canadian accountants, engineers and scientists and the implications for returns to investment in university education."

Career

He was Assistant Professor of Economics at Queen's University, Associate Professor of Canadian Studies and International Economics at the School of Advanced International Studies at Johns Hopkins University, Senior Fellow in the Faculty of Commerce at the University of British Columbia, and Visiting Professor in the Department of Economics at Simon Fraser University. He has also served as Director of the International Economics Program of the Institute for Research on Public Policy.

Canadian Politics 
Dodge served in the senior ranks of the Canadian federal government from 1992 to 2001, a month before his appointment as the Bank of Canada Governor.

Deputy Minister of Finance 
He was appointed Deputy Minister of Finance in 1992. In the 1996 book Double Vision, Edward Greenspon and Anthony Wilson-Smith describe in detail the role which Dodge played in reviving Canada's economy by working closely with Finance Minister Paul Martin to eliminate the federal budget's deficit spending.

Deputy Minister of Health 
In 1998, Dodge was appointed the Deputy Minister of Health. While Deputy, Dodge's role in founding the Winnipeg National Microbiology Laboratory was commended as critically important by laboratory director-general Frank Plummer.

Bank of Canada 
In 2001, Dodge was appointed the Governor of the Bank of Canada. His appointment was controversial as the Bank of Canada traditionally promotes from within, helping to avoid the perception of politicizing of the central bank. During Dodge's term, annual inflation stayed close to the Bank of Canada's target of 2 percent, and the Canadian economy avoided any recessions. In 2008, Dodge retired from the Bank of Canada, and was replaced by Mark Carney.

Following his exit from the Bank, Dodge joined the Canadian law firm Bennett Jones as a senior advisor.

Chancellor of Queen's University 
Dodge was elected as the 13th chancellor of Queen's University on May 2, 2008, succeeding A. Charles Baillie. The appointment was effective July 1, 2008, though Dodge was only officially installed later that year, on October 30. As his first three-year term drew to a close, Dodge's re-appointment was unanimously endorsed by the Queen's University Council, and Dodge served until his retirement at the end of his second-term on June 30, 2014. He was subsequently appointed chancellor emeritus by the University Council, an honorary title he still holds today.

Dodge was elected to the Royal Society of Canada in October, 2009.

He was made an Officer of the Order of Canada in 2007.

References

Further reading
 Double Vision: The Inside Story of the Liberals in Power, by Edward Greenspon and Anthony Wilson-Smith, Toronto 1996, Doubleday Canada publishers, .

External links

 Bank of Canada – Biography of David A. Dodge

1943 births
Living people
Canadian economists
Chancellors of Queen's University at Kingston
Fellows of the Royal Society of Canada
Governors of the Bank of Canada
Johns Hopkins University faculty
Officers of the Order of Canada
People from Toronto
Princeton University alumni
Queen's University at Kingston alumni
Academic staff of the Queen's University at Kingston
Ridley College alumni
Academic staff of Simon Fraser University